The 2015–16 UEFA Youth League knockout phase (play-offs and round of 16 onwards) began on 9 February 2016 and concluded on 18 April 2016 with the final at Colovray Stadium in Nyon, Switzerland, which decided the champions of the 2015–16 UEFA Youth League. A total of 24 teams competed in the knockout phase.

Times up to 26 March 2016 (play-offs, round of 16 and quarter-finals) were CET (UTC+1), thereafter times (semi-finals and final) were CEST (UTC+2).

Round and draw dates
The schedule of the competition was as follows (all draws were held at the UEFA headquarters in Nyon, Switzerland).

Format
The knockout phase involved 24 teams: 16 teams which qualified from the UEFA Champions League Path (eight group winners and eight group runners-up), and eight teams which qualified from the Domestic Champions Path (eight second round winners):
The eight group winners from the UEFA Champions League Path entered the round of 16.
The eight group runners-up from the UEFA Champions League Path and the eight second round winners from the Domestic Champions Path entered the play-offs. The eight play-off winners advanced to the round of 16.

Each tie in the knockout phase was played over one match. If the scores were level after full-time, the match was decided by a penalty shoot-out (no extra time was played).

The mechanism of the draws for each round was as follows:
In the draw for the play-offs, the eight second round winners from the Domestic Champions Path were drawn against the eight group runners-up from the UEFA Champions League Path, with the teams from the Domestic Champions Path hosting the match. Teams from the same association could not be drawn against each other.
In the draw for the round of 16, the eight group winners from the UEFA Champions League Path were drawn against the eight play-off winners. Teams from the same UEFA Champions League Path group could not be drawn against each other, but teams from the same association could be drawn against each other. The draw also decided the home team for each round of 16 match.
In the draws for the quarter-finals onwards, there were no seedings, and teams from the same UEFA Champions League Path group or the same association could be drawn against each other. The draws also decided the home team for each quarter-final, and the "home" team for administrative purposes for each semi-final and final (which were played at a neutral venue).

Qualified teams

UEFA Champions League Path

Domestic Champions Path

Play-offs
The draw for the play-offs was held on 14 December 2015. The play-offs were played on 9 and 10 February 2016.

|}

Bracket (round of 16 onwards)
The draw for the round of 16 onwards was held on 15 February 2016.

Round of 16
The round of 16 matches were played on 23 and 24 February 2016.

|}

Match originally finished 0–2 in favour of Dinamo Zagreb, but was awarded by UEFA as 3–0 win for Anderlecht due to Dinamo Zagreb fielding suspended player Matija Fintić.

Quarter-finals
The quarter-finals were played on 8, 9 and 15 March 2016.

|}

Semi-finals
The semi-finals were played on 15 April 2016 at Colovray Stadium, Nyon.

|}

Final
The final was played on 18 April 2016 at Colovray Stadium, Nyon.

References

External links
2015–16 UEFA Youth League

3